Anil Kumarsingh Gayan (born 22 October 1948 in Triolet, Mauritius) was the foreign minister of Mauritius from 1983 until 1986 and from September 2000 until a cabinet reshuffle in December 2003.  He is the descendant of laborers who came to Mauritius from India when the island was a British colony.  He is part of a newly established political party after leaving the MSM, his former party. He studied at the London School of Economics after winning a scholarship. In 2008, he was part of United Nations mediation in Guinea-Bissau.  In 2009, he formed a new group called FNM (Front National Mauricien) which is against the three main political parties of Republic Of Mauritius.  The group's first appearance for elections was in the No.8 Constituency by elections.

Mr. Gayan later joined the Muvman Liberater( a splinter group of the MMM, the first party of Mr Gayan) and was elected in the 2014 general election in constituency No 20- Beau Bassin. He was part of Cabinet as Minister of Health (2014-2017) and then as Minister of Tourism (2017- ).

Mr Gayan is  a Senior Counsel

Gayan led a 20-member African Union group of observers for the 2010 Rwanda election.

Controversies

In 2015, the appointment of the head of the Cardiac Center, which is a department under Gayan's ministry, caused some controversy.  In May 2016, Gayan sent a "Freedom of Information" email to a newspaper to request the newspaper to provide information about the salary of its staff.  The Director of Publications of the newspaper replied by disclosing his salary and commented that the newspaper is a private entity.  In June 2016, several Non-Governmental Organizations were concerned about the increase in usage of synthetic drugs in Mauritius while Gayan stated that the situation was not alarming.

References

1948 births
Living people
Foreign Ministers of Mauritius
People from Pamplemousses District
Mauritian diplomats
Militant Socialist Movement politicians
Mauritian politicians of Indian descent